A-TEC Industries AG was an international industrial holding company based in Vienna, Austria. It belonged to the Austrian industrialist Mirko Kovats. A-TEC was quoted on the Vienna stock exchange from the end of 2006 until February 2014. In 2007, the group of companies accounted for nearly 14.000 employees and had a turnover of more than 2 billion Euro. A-TEC was active in the areas of power plant construction, drive technology, industrial engineering and minerals & metals.

In October 2010, A-TEC went bankrupt and the company's assets were sold off by a trustee. The sell-off was completed by mid-2012.

References

Electrical equipment manufacturers
Energy companies of Austria
Industrial machine manufacturers
Companies based in Vienna
Austrian brands